Nicholls is a surname of English origin. It is one of the patronymics derived from the given name Nicholas. The first record of the spelling is in 1322, in Staffordshire, England.

Notable people with name

Entertainment
 Agnes Nicholls (1876–1959), English soprano
 Billy Nicholls (born 1949), English musician
 Brooke Nicholls, Canadian singer and songwriter
 Craig Nicholls (born 1977), Australian musician
 Danielle Nicholls (born 1978), English television presenter
 Geoff Nicholls (1948–2017), English musician
 Graeme Nicholls, English guitarist
 Harry Nicholls (comedian) (1852–1926), English comedian
 Morgan Nicholls (born 1971), English musician
 Peter Nicholls (musician) (born 1959), English singer
 Phoebe Nicholls (born 1957), English actress
 Rachel Nicholls, English soprano
 Sue Nicholls (born 1943), English actress
 Victoria Nicholls, Australian actress

Politics
 Douglas Nicholls (1906–1988), Australian Governor of South Australia
 Donald Nicholls, Baron Nicholls of Birkenhead (1933–2019), British Law Lord
 Francis T. Nicholls (1834–1912), American Confederate Army general, lawyer, judge and politician
 Jamie Nicholls (politician) (born 1971), Canadian politician
 Patrick Nicholls (born 1948), English politician
 Samuel Nicholls (1885–1939), Australian politician

Sports
 Andy Nicholls (born 1962), English soccer hooligan and writer 
 Alex Nicholls (born 1987), English footballer
 Ashley Nicholls (born 1981), English footballer
 Benjamin Nicholls (1864–1945), English cricketer
 Bernie Nicholls (born 1961), Canadian ice hockey player
 Eddie Nicholls (born 1947), Guyanese cricketer
 Frederick Nicholls (1868–1950), British rugby player
 Gwyn Nicholls (1874–1939), British rugby player
 Jack Nicholls (footballer) (1898–1970), Welsh footballer
 John Nicholls (footballer) (born 1939), Australian rules footballer
 Kevin Nicholls (born 1979), English footballer
 Mel Nicholls (born 1977), English wheelchair athlete 
 Mikey Nicholls (born 1985), Australian wrestler known as Nick Miller
 Ryan Nicholls (born 1973), Welsh footballer
 Sydney Nicholls (1868–1946), British rugby player
 Thomas Nicholls (boxer) (1931–2021), British boxer

Others
 David Shaw Nicholls (born 1959), Scottish architect and designer
 George Nicholls (disambiguation), multiple people
 Graham Nicholls (born 1975), English artist
 Harry Nicholls (1915–1975), English recipient of the Victoria Cross
 Jill Nicholls, British documentary filmmaker
 John Graham Nicholls (born 1929), British/Swiss physiologist
 Kenneth Nicholls, Irish academic and historian
 Obed Nicholls (1885–1962), English craftsman
 Peter Nicholls (writer) (1939–2018), Australian literary scholar and critic
 Rhoda Holmes Nicholls (1854–1930), English-American painter
 Sally Nicholls (born 1983), British writer
 Stan Nicholls (born 1949), British writer
 Will Nicholls (born 1995), British photographer and film-maker
 William Henry Nicholls (1885–1951), Australian botanist

Fictional characters
 Deputy Roy Nicholls, a character in the 2019 film Scary Stories to Tell in the Dark
 Stella Nicholls, a character in the 2019 film Scary Stories to Tell in the Dark

See also
 Gerard Paul Greenhalgh (born 1979), English actor known professionally as Paul Nicholls
 Nicholls (disambiguation)
 Nichols (surname)

References 

English-language surnames
Patronymic surnames
Surnames from given names